633 Zelima is a minor planet orbiting the Sun in the asteroid belt with a magnitude of 10.7.
The name may have been inspired by the asteroid's provisional designation 1907 ZM.

References

External links 
 Lightcurve plot of 633 Zelima, Palmer Divide Observatory, B. D. Warner (2006)
 Asteroid Lightcurve Database (LCDB), query form (info )
 Dictionary of Minor Planet Names, Google books
 Asteroids and comets rotation curves, CdR – Observatoire de Genève, Raoul Behrend
 Discovery Circumstances: Numbered Minor Planets (1)-(5000) – Minor Planet Center
 
 

Eos asteroids
Zelima
Zelima
S-type asteroids (Tholen)
S-type asteroids (SMASS)
19070512